Steppe Dawns is a 1953 Soviet drama film directed by Lev Saakov based on the eponymous novel by Boris Bedny.

The film received a permit dated March 25, 1953 for the all-Union hire except Moscow, Leningrad and the capitals of the republics of the Soviet Union, but then the Ministry of culture of the USSR imposed a complete ban on the production of the film "because of the extremely low ideological and artistic level." According to film critics Evgeny Margolit and Vyacheslav Shmyrov: "the film made by all the canons of the conflict-free theory and good fight with the best principle has lost all relevance in the new political environment".

Cast
 Iya Arepina as Varya  
 Lev Frichinsky as Styopa
 Nikolay Moskalenko as Alexey
 Yuriy Sarantsev as Pshenytsyn
 Georgi Gumilevsky as Pavel
 Leonid Kmit 
 Boris Runge 
 Rimma Shorokhova 
 Valentina Telegina 
 Viktor Uralskiy 
 Pavel Volkov

References

External links 
 

1953 films
1953 drama films
Soviet drama films
1950s Russian-language films
Films directed by Lev Saakov
Soviet black-and-white films